The NDIS Quality and Safeguards Commission, also referred to as the NDIS Commission, is an independent commission that was established to improve the quality and safety of services funded by the National Disability Insurance Scheme. The NDIS Commission regulates NDIS providers, provides national consistency, promotes safety and quality services, resolves problems and identifies areas for improvement. The NDIS Commission commenced operations in New South Wales and South Australia on 1 July 2018, before expanding progressively across the nation where it now acts in all states and territories.

Purpose 
The NDIS Commission was created by an amendment to the National Disability Insurance Scheme Act (NDIS Act), passed by parliament in 2017. It was created in December 2017 to "improve the quality and safety of NDIS supports and services." The Commission exists as part of a federal agreement between the Australian Government and states and territory governments. This agreement is called the NDIS Quality and Safeguarding Framework and aligns the various quality and safeguard functions performed by each state and territory government during the initial rollout of the NDIS and includes additional investigative and regulatory powers. The NDIS Commission’s role is to manage complaints about NDIS providers, improve the quality and safety of NDIS supports and services, regulate NDIS service providers and workers, and lead education, capacity building and development for people with disability, NDIS providers and workers. The commission does not regulate the National Disability Insurance Agency (NDIA), which operates the NDIS scheme.

Rollout 
The NDIS Commission began operations across Australia in a staggered rollout that began in New South Wales and South Australia on 1 July 2018, followed by Queensland, the Australian Capital Territory, the Northern Territory, Victoria and Tasmania on 1 July 2019 and was completed in Western Australia on 1 December 2020.  The Commission was originally planned to roll out to Western Australia on 1 July 2020; however, it was postponed by the state government until 1 December to create capacity for providers to focus on clinical care during the COVID-19 pandemic in Australia.

Structure 
The NDIS Commission is led by the NDIS Commissioner, Registrar and Chief Operating Officer. These three roles are supported by the Senior Practitioner, the Complaints Commissioner, Deputy Registrar, and General Counsel. The NDIS Commission falls under the portfolio of the Minister for the National Disability Insurance Scheme, although the Commission is largely independent from government.

Commissioners 
The NDIS Quality and Safeguards Commissioner has overarching control over the NDIS Commission and is the legislated executor of powers given under the NDIS Act.

The inaugural NDIS Quality and Safeguards Commissioner was Graeme Head, who served as Commissioner from December 2017 until June 2021. Samantha Taylor served as the Acting Commissioner from July 2021 to January 2022. Tracy Mackey was appointed as the new NDIS Quality and Safeguards Commissioner in November 2021, and commenced her three-year term in January 2022.

References

External links 
 
 
 

Commonwealth Government agencies of Australia
Disability in Australia
Quality assurance organizations